The Glendora Historical Society (also known as the Society; abbr. GHS) is a privately funded nonprofit organization based in Glendora, California.  The Society produces original exhibitions; maintains a collection of historical documents, photographs, and other research materials; and hosts educational events.

History 
The Society was chartered in 1947, when Glendora was still a quiet citrus community nestled against the northern foothills of the San Gabriel Valley.  The earliest purpose of the organization was both historical and social—to discuss and collect history and gather the venerable first families in the valley.  It has operated the Glendora Historical Museum since 1952, and has owned the Rubel Castle in Glendora since 2005.  New bylaws were adopted in 2013 as the Society went through a realignment to streamline organizational efficiency and optimize public services.

Present 
Throughout the year, the Society provides a varied program of lectures, panels, and discussions on historical and cultural topics, ranging from local interests, to events and people of national significance.

The Society liaises with the City of Glendora, the Glendora Public Library, the Hayden Memorial Library at Citrus College, and the University Libraries Special Collection of Azusa Pacific University.

Museum 
Since 1952, the Glendora Museum has been housed in the Old City Hall, the first civic building built in Glendora, completed in 1913.  This portion of the museum, named the Grace Sutherland Wing, had also been used as the city firehouse, police department and jail before 1923, and as the Frank J. Gard American Legion Post #153, until 1951.  A second wing, the Merrill West Memorial Hall, was added in 1989.  Admission to the Museum is free to the public.

The extensive Glendora Historical Society Archive contains memorabilia and resources dating to the 1850s and is among the earliest archives in the valley, attracting authors, researchers, and students of history at all levels.  The Society Archive is accessible several times a year for public research.

Castle 
Constructed from 1959 to 1986, Rubel Castle was added to the National Register of Historic Places in 2013.  The castle features the Courtyard, Tin Palace, Big Kitchen, the Ed Bennett Room (used for Board Meetings), castle gardens, and living spaces for tenants.  Tours are available at the Castle by reservation-only.

Major castle operations include scheduled tours and preservation efforts.

In June, the Society Board of Directors are sworn into office during the Annual Banquet at the Courtyard.  Every December, the Castle is dressed with Christmas finery, and members are invited to a free social tea.

The Society was host to the "Rancho San Jose Dinner," a fundraising event held in the Castle Courtyard each summer and which aims to raise money for historical preservation and restoration.  Funds from the 2016 dinner have gone toward the Society's collection of antique vehicles.

Collections 
H. Paul Keiser Memorial Collection

Paul Keiser was from an early Glendora family (pre-1890), and served as the first Society Curator.  Having a reputation as a great valley historian, Keiser amassed a collection of artifacts and records years before the formation of the earliest historical organizations in the upper San Gabriel Valley.  The Memorial Collection was established after his death in 1951.

Bobbie Battler Archive

The Society received the bulk of the papers, notes, and records which had been maintained by historian, author and columnist Bobbie Battler after her death in 2003.

Michael Clarke Rubel Collection

The acquisition of Rubel Castle in 2005 included the full collection of objects and artifacts which builder Michael Rubel had amassed during his world travels.  The collection ranges from Revolutionary War-era cannons, paintings, metal work and folk art, antique vehicles and equipment, and numerous objet d'art, spanning centuries.  The Collection is spread across almost two acres of property, with the majority housed in the Tin Palace.

Current Major Exhibitions 
 Before the Golden Arches: A Look at Richard and Maurice McDonald (opened January 2017) an exploration of the life of the McDonald's founders when they lived in Depression-era Glendora, including the movie theater they owned and the local inspiration for their restaurant business
 Cubs Win!: Frank Chance of Glendora (opened November 2016) a celebration of Frank Chance, the professional baseball player and team manager who led the Chicago Cubs to two world-series victories (1907 and 1908), in commemoration of the Cubs 2016 World Series win
 Citrus Speaks: 100 Years of Citrus College (opened August 2014) a look at the history of Citrus College, the first public junior college in Los Angeles County, and the 5th oldest in the state of California, from its beginning as a rural high school in the 1890s, the addition of its first college curriculum in 1915, to the bustling commuter campus it is today
 The Glendora Story (ongoing exhibit) chronicling the history of lands that would come to be called Glendora, from the time of the native inhabitants who called the area "Askusagna," through the era of Spanish Missions, the Rancho years (1837-1860s), the American settlers (1870s), up until city incorporation in 1913.

Membership 
Anyone with an interest in history can petition for membership into the Society via an application process.  The Society Year begins July 1, and closes June 30 the next year.  Annual dues are collected before June 30.

Members are annotated on the Membership Roll (known informally since the 1950s as the Glendora Social Register), which is published annually.

Society Presidents 

 1947–48...Ruth Pratt Kimball
 1948–49...Dr. Glenn Odell
 1949–50...Louise Thum
 1950–51...Leslie Warren
 1951–52...Roger Dalton
 1952–53...John Lyon
 1953–54...Grace Sutherland
 1954–55...Roy Lundh
 1955–56...Grace Sutherland
 1956–57...Earl Chapman
 1957–58...Roy Lundh
 1958–60...Frank Brown
 1960–61...Dorothy Chambers
 1961–63...Donnell Spencer
 1963–66...Helen Bettin
 1966–67...Hon. Merrill West
 1967–68...Alice Tscharner
 1968–72...Laura Ady
 1972–76...John McAllister
 1976–79...Jeanne West
 1979–82...Mildred Kobzeff
 1982–83...Hon. John Hackney
 1983–85...Hon. Merrill West
 1985–87...Charles Page
 1987–89...Ida Fracasse
 1989–90...Hon. John Gordon
 1990–91...Hon. Ken Prestesater
 1991–92...Ida Fracasse
 1992–94...Nelson Price
 1994–96...Georgia Hawthorne
 1996–97...Hon. John Gordon
 1997–98...Margaret House
 1998–99...Hon. John Gordon
 1999–2001...John Lundstrom
 2001–02...Hon. John Gordon
 2002–05...John Lundstrom
 2005–06...John Lundstrom & Jesse Tomory
 2006–07...Jesse Tomory
 2007–09...John Lundstrom
 2009–10...John Lundstrom & Dr. Kay Waters
 2010–11...Dr. Kay Waters
 2011–13...Hon. Mike Conway
 2013–18...Jim Riley
2019-21...Steven Bluitt Flowers

Historical societies in California